Grupo Montez de Durango or Montez de Durango is a Regional Mexican band that specializes in the Duranguense genre. They are based out of Aurora, Illinois, and are well known in the United States, Mexico and Central America.

History
José Luis Terrazas founded Grupo Montez de Durango in 1996. Terrazas, who was born in Durango, Mexico, grew up in Chicago and was a percussionist in the marching band at his high school. He hooked up with a traditional Mexican banda and learned that these groups were very popular in Chicago. The next step was the formation of his own group.

The seven-member group soon became a popular draw at local dance halls. Terrazas was influenced by Tierra Caliente group La Dinastía de Tuzantla. Membership in the group includes leader Jose Luis Terrazas, Daniel Terrazas (drummer and son), Jose Luis Terrazas Jr (Hype Man) and other musicians. Besides covers of older traditional Mexican songs, the group played a faster-paced style of music: a polka-ranchera mix. This musical style became associated with the dance style called "El Pasito Duranguense" (The Durango Step) and Grupo Montez de Durango was the band most closely identified with it. Terrazas founded his own Terrazas Records label and the band began recording and releasing albums.

In time, one of the major labels signed the group, but the label wanted the group to change its sound and they soon parted ways. The group signed with a Mexican independent label and released El Sube y Baja in 2002. The band's next release followed in 2003, and De Durango a Chicago debuted at No. 2 on the Top Latin Albums chart. A live album, En Vivo Desde Chicago (with a DVD), was released early in 2004. A year later, Y Sigue La Mata Dando was released and in 2006.

The group fractured that same year with several members, including vocalist Alfredo Ramirez Corral, breaking away to form their own group, Los Creadorez del Pasito Duranguense De Alfredo Ramírez. Montez de Durango re-grouped, replenished their ranks, and released a new studio album, Borrón y Cuenta Nueva, which won a Billboard Award for Album Of the Year in the summer of 2007, showing doubters they were stronger than ever. They also released two albums in 2008, Vida Mafiosa in March and Nosotros Somos in October.

In 2010 they came back with a new studio album, Con Estilo... Chicago Style, debuting number 1 on the charts and with a new tour Mi Necesidad Tour 2010.  The band followed this release with the hit "Descuide" on the 2012 MMXII album. On this album Montez de Durango also filmed a music video with a special guest appearance from José José on the second single "He Renunciado A TI".

In spring 2014 Montez de Durango launched a self-released compilation album Montez de Durango: Presenta. The label "Cruz de Piedra" is owned by Jose Luis Terrazas and featured label artists Norteñisimo Zierra Azul & Rey Román for the compilation. This album launched 6 music videos for the album gaining over 3 million views in all.

On February 18, 2016, Montez de Durango launched the album De Vuelta A La Sierra. In interviews the band mentioned how proud they are with this release because it is an album that goes back to the roots of the group's music. "De Vuelta A La Sierra" is a "Cruz de Piedra" production.

In 2017 they released a new hand album with the Remex Musica label with the name "Sin Cambiar el Estilo" from which the singles "Como Quieren que la Olvide, Cuatro Rosas y Como Cuento de Hadas" are released. Officials for the Remex Music channel.

In 2018 the album Arriba La Sierra was released with 10 songs with the unique Durango style and features a ballad titled Tú sin mí and also includes some of the most recognized hits of the composer and singer-songwriter Marco Antonio Solís entitled Mi mayor sacrifocio.

Discography
1997 Rama Seca
1. Rama Seca
2. Me Persigue Tu Sombra
3. Sigue José, Ramon, Y María
4. Todos Lloramos
5. Paloma Herrante
6. Santiago Papasquiaro
7. Ingrata Mujer
8. Me Duele
9. Tus Mentiras
10. Tu Y La Mentira
1998 Tu Mirada
1. La Novia Del Pajarillo
2. Señora Enamorada
3. Poquito A Poco
4. Tu Mirada
5. Nomas Las Mujeres Quedan
6. Una Noche Serena Y Obscura
7. El Obscuro De La Vara
8. Paloma Sin Nido
9. En Donde Estarás
10. Te Necesito Tanto Amor
1999 La Ausencia
1. La Ausencia
2. Se Les Pelo Baltazar
3. Tu Me Has Cambiado
4. Ezequiel Rodríguez
5. Los 500 Novillos
6. Como Un Pájaro Errante
7. Temporada En La Sierra
8. Solo Amigos
9. Lastima Es Mi Mujer
10. El 4 Negro
2000 Los Primos de Baltazar
1. Los Laureles
2. El Moreno
3. Tres Ramitas
4. Macario Leyva
5. La Hierba Se Movia
6. Flor Del Río
7. Los Primos De Baltazar
8. Al Despertar
9. La Rafailita
10. Estoy Enamorado
2001 Con Sabor A Tamborazo
1. Catarino Y Los Rurales
2. Clave 7
3. La Revolcada
4. Carne Quemada
5. Bailándo En La Sierra
6. Camino A Tepehuanes
7. Las Mulas De Garame
8. La Pava
9. Liborio Cano
10. La Milpa
2002 Sube y Baja
1. El Sube Y Baja
2. Las Mismas Piedras
3. Bachi Polka
4. Recordando A Durango
5. Hilarió Carrillo
6. De La Cintura Para Abajo-Palomo
7. Mi Gusto Es
8. El Verde Pinito
9. Pasito Duranguense
10. Hoy Empieza Mi Tristeza
11. Lino Rodarte
12. Baraja De Oro-Palomo
2003 De Durango A Chicago
1. Lagrimas De Cristal
2. Te Quise Olvidar
3. Vengo A Buscarte
4. Ignacio Parra
5. Colonia Hidalgo, Durango Querido
6. Hoy Empieza Mi Tristeza-Pop Versión
7. El Huérfano
8. En Otros Tiempos
9. De Durango A Chicago
10. Los Dos Hermanos Rivales
11. El Hijo Ausente (ft. Hector Montemayor)
12. Hoy Empieza Mi Tristeza-Norteño Versión
2004 En Vivo Desde Chicago
1. El Sube Y Baja (Live)
2. Lagrimas De Cristal (Live)
3. El Verde Pinito (Live)
4. En Otros Tiempos (Live)
5. Pasito Duranguense (Live)
6. Las Mismas Piedras (Live)
7. Hoy Empieza Mi Tristeza (Live)
8. Llegando A Zacatecas (Live)
9. La Revolcada (Live)
10. Camino A Tepehuanes (Live)
11. El Huérfano (Live)
12. Lino Rodarte (Live)
13. Colonia Hidalgo, Durango Querido (Live)
14. Hoy Empieza Mi Tristeza-Norteño Versión (Live)
2005 Y Sigue La Mata Dando
1. Vestida De Color De Rosa
2. Puro Durango
3. Contrabando En Juárez
4. De Esta Sierra A La Otra Sierra
5. Adios Amor Te Vas
6. Solo Deje Yo A Mi Padre
7. Seis Renglones
8. Me Llamas
9. Te Voy A Esperar
10. Una Lágrima
11. Quiero Saber De Ti
12. Lastima Es Mi Mujer
13. Esperanzas
14. La Historia
2006 500 Novillos
1. Ausencia Eterna
2. 4 De Octubre
3. Santiago Papasquiaro
4. La Musita
5. 500 Novillos
6. Temporada En La Sierra
7. Tú Me Has Cambiado
8. Se Les Pelo Baltazar
9. Solo Amigos
10. Ezequiel Rodríguez
11. Como Un Pájaro Herrante
12. Lastima Es Mi Mujer (Cumbia)
2006  Los Super Corridos
1. Se Les Pelo Baltazar
2. Clave 7
3. Ignacio Parra
4. Los Dos Hermanos Rivales
5. Lino Rodarte
6. Temporada En La Sierra
7. Ezequiel Rodríguez
8. Contrabando En Juárez
9. 500 Novillos
10. 4 De Octubre
11. Liborio Cano
12. Catarino Y Los Rurales
2006 Borrón y Cuenta Nueva
1. Para Ti Con Amor
2. La Borracha
3. Que Vuelva
4. Hasta La Última Lagrima
5. Adiós A Mi Amante
6. El Ahuichote
7. El Cerro De La Silla
8. Me Duele Escuchar Tu Nombre
9. Las Cuatro Velas
10. Brindando A Diario
11. La Polkita Duranguense
2006 Puro Tamborazo Al Estilo
1. Cándido Rodríguez
2. Catarino Y Los Rurales
3. China De Los Ojos Negros
4. De Esta Sierra A La Otra Sierra
5. El Novillo Despuntado
6. La Cabrona
7. El Corrido De Los Perez
8. Paloma Errante
9. Santiago Papasquiaro
10. Te Vas Ángel Mío
2007 Agárrese
1. El Hijo Del Amor
2. Chuy Y Mauricio
3. El Chivo Pelón
4. Bachata Rosa
5. Donde Esta
6. Etapas De Mi Vida
7. Lagrimas Del Corazón
8. Chaparrita
9. Ujule
10. La Banda Dominguera
11. Como En Los Buenos Tiempos
12. Me Duele Escuchar Tu Nombre-Balada Versión
2007 En Directo De México A Guatemala
1. Lagrimillas Tontas (Live)
2. Donde Esta (Live)
3. Me Duele Escuchar Tu Nombre (Live)
4. El Chivo Pelón (Live)
5. Quiero Saber De Ti (Live)
6. Adiós A Mi Amante (Live)
7. Solo Deje Yo A Mi Padre (Live)
8. Que Vuelva (Live)
9. Lastima Es Mi Mujer (Live)
10. El Diablo En Una Botella (Live)
11. Esperanzas (Live)
12. La Piojosa
2008 Vida Mafiosa
1. El Federal De Zacatecas
2. De Durango Hasta Chicago
3. Dos Gallos De Oro
4. El Cajoncito
5. El General
6. Esta De Parranda El Jefe
7. La Hummer De Culiacan
8. La Imagen Del Malverde
9. Mi Último Contrabando
10. Pascual Sarmiento
11. Vida Mafiosa
2008 Nosotros Somos
1. Espero
2. Diez Kilómetros A Pie
3. Hay Tristeza En Mis Ojos
4. Bendito Cielo
5. Cumbia Del Río
6. El Llanto De Un Illegal
7. Te Pido Perdón
8. Lo Que Un Dia Fue No Será
9. Disparame Dispara
10. Corazón De Texas
11. Porque Te Vas
12. La Reina Del Cielo
13. La Mancha
2009 El Borracho
1. El Borracho
2. Vives En Mi Corazón
3. Espero-Versión Villera
4. Me Duele Escuchar Tu Nombre
5. Adiós A Mi Amante
6. Lagrimas Del Corazón
7. Cumbia Del Río
8. Como En Los Buenos Tiempos
9. Etapas De Mi Vida
10. El Llanto De Un Illegal
2010 Cerrando Trato (Corridos Con Tuba)
1. Cerrando Trato
2. Hombre De Negocios
3. Liborio Cano
4. El Borracho
5. El Piloto Suicida
6. Rafa Y Su Primo
7. Paseando Y Tomando
8. Elpidio Pasos
9. La Autopista 15
10. El Cuatro Negro
2010 Con Estilo...Chicago Style
1. Montesitos
2. Entre Verde Y Azul
3. Atrapado
4. Mi Necesidad
5. Flor De Mar
6. Nacido Y Creado
7. No Quiero Saber De Ti
8. Sabiendo Quien Era Yo
9. El Farolito
10. Que Triste Es Un Adios
2012 MMXII
1. Descuide
2. El Hijo Que No Volvió
3. Tú Me Has Cambiado
4. Contrabando Del Paso
5. Caprichosa María
6. Me Equivoqué
7. He Renunciado A Ti
8. El Día De Tu Boda
9. La Fuga Del Rojo
10. El Trailer Negro
11. Deseo
12. A Donde Aviento El Corazón
2014 Montez de Durango Presenta
1. Fecha De Caducidad-Montéz De Durango
2. Tuve (ft. Montéz De Durango)-Rey Roman
3. El Moro De Tepehuanes-Norteñisimo Zierra Azul
4. Nadie Me Verá Llorar-Montéz De Durango
5. Todo Menos Tu-Rey Roman
6. Mis Dos Vicios-Norteñisimo Zierra Azul
7. Ni Borracho Te Olvido-Montéz De Durango
8. Mi Cigarro-Rey Roman
9. Mi Viejo Querido-Norteñisimo Zierra Azul
10. Mirame-Rey Roman
11. Te Deje Por Mala-Montéz De Durango
2016 De Vuelta A La Sierra
1. Soy Duranguense
2. Rama Seca
3. El Pajarillo
4. Nadie Me Verá Llorar
5. Los Cañeros
6. Las Mulas De Garame
7. Mis Paisanos Y Yo
8. Polvorete
9. El Padrino
10. Hermosa Historia
11. En Un Jaripeo
12. Con Permiso
2017 Sin Cambiar El Estilo
1. Por Infamias Del Destino
2. Como Quieren Que La Olvidé?
3. Soy Como Soy
4. Borrare Tu Nombre
5. Ese Que Traes A Tu Lado
6. Los Frijoles Bailan
7. Privilegio
8. Cuatro Rosas
9. Como Cuento De Hadas
10. Mis Tiempos Pasados
11. Me Equivoqué
2018 Arriba La Sierra
1. Se Te Olvido
2. Imposible Olvidarte
3. De Torreon A Lerdo
4. Jinetez En El Cielo
5. Mi Mayor Sacrificio
6. La Yaquesita
7. Canción Del Mariachi
8. Devuélveme Mi Libertad
9. Tampico Hermoso
10. Tu Sin Mi
2020 Puras Pa’ Bailar
1. Baila Conmigo
2. Chili Piquín 
3. Cuando Los Frijoles Bailan
4. De Torreón A Lerdo
5. Jinetez En El Cielo
6. Tampico Hermoso
7. Juan Colorado
8. Canción Del Mariachi 
9. La Yaquesita
10. El Polvorete
11. Cuatro Rosas
2021 Corridos Clásicos En Studio Vol 1.
1. Clave 7
2. Chuy Y Mauricio 
3. Lino Rodarte
4. Se Les Pelo Baltazar
5. La Imagen De Malverde 
6. Macario Leyva 
7. 500 Novillos 
8. El 4 Negro
9. Vida Mafiosa 
10. Mi Último Contrabando

2022 Con Sabor A Tamborazo Vol 2.
1. Durango, Durango
2. El Pájaro Prieto
3. Caminos De Guanajuato
4. El Frijolito 
5. Me Persigue De Tu Sombra 
6. El Pavido Navido
7. Caminos De Michoacan
8. Lo Que Más Me Martiriza 
9. Hey, Baby Que Paso?
10. Nieves De Enero 
11. Como Extraño Mi Sierra (ft. Los Sembradores)

Singles
1997 Rama Seca
1998 Tu Mirada
1999 La Ausencia
2000 Los Primos de Baltazar
2000 La Hierba se Movía
2001 Catarino y Los Rurales
2002 El Sube y Baja
2002 Las Mismas Piedras
2003 Hoy Empieza Mi Tristeza
2003 Lágrimas de Cristal
2003 El Huérfano
2004 Te Quise Olvidar
2004 Quiero Saber de Tí
2005 Sólo Dejé Yo a Mi Padre
2005 Adiós Amor Te Vas
2005 Esperanzas
2005 Lagrimillas Tontas
2006 Adiós A Mi Amante
2007 Que Vuelva
2007 Me Duele Escuchar Tu Nombre
2007 Lágrimas del Corazón
2007 La Piojosa
2008 Como En Los Buenos Tiempos
2008 Etapas de Mi Vida
2008 Espero
2009 Lo Que Un Día Fue, No Será
2009 Porque Te Vas
2009 El Borracho
2010 Paseando Y Tomando
2010 Mi Necesidad
2010 Que Triste es un Adios
2011 He Renunciado a Ti
2012 A Donde Aviento El Corazon
2012  Descuide
2013 Fecha De Caducidad 
2013 Ni Borracho Te Olvido
2014 Nadie me vera llorar
2014  Con Permiso
2015  Los Cañeros
2015  Soy Duranguense
2016 Como Quieren Que La Olvide
2016 Mulas de Garame
2017 Por Infamias Del Destino
2017 Cuatro Rosas
2017 Me Equivoque
2018 Imposible Olvidarte
2018 Tu Sin Mi
2018 Mi Mayor Sacrificio
2019 El Hijo Ausente
2020 Bajo El Cielo De Torreón
2020 La Mancha (feat. Los Potros)
2020 Vive (feat. Beto Terrazas)
2021 Vengo A Verte
2021 Tenme Fe
2021 Muñeca De Ojos De Miel
2021 Piensa Morena
2022 El Moro De Tepehuanes
2022 Fue Tan Poco Tu Cariño
2022 Como Extraño A Mi Sierra (ft. Los Sembradores)

References

External links
Official Website
Youtube
Facebook
Instagram
Twitter
Spotify

 01
American duranguense musicians
Duranguense music groups
American Latin musical groups
Musical groups from Chicago